Arnis (the Philippine martial art) competitions within the 2013 Palarong Pambansa were held in Holy Cross High School Gym from April 21–26, 2013. A total of 27 events were contested. Below are the winners.

Medal summary

Medal table

Elementary Boy's Division

Elementary Girl's Division

Secondary Boy's Division

Secondary Girl's Division

See also 
 Arnis
 Filipino Martial Arts

References

External links 
 2013 Palarong Pambansa Official Website
 2013 Palarong Pambansa Special Coverage by Rappler.com
Department of Education

2013
Arnis
Palarong
April 2013 sports events in the Philippines